John LaFontaine (born May 15, 1990) is a lacrosse player for the New England Black Wolves in the National Lacrosse League. LaFontaine was drafted in the third round (28th overall) in the 2010 NLL Entry Draft by the Rush.

Statistics

NLL

References

External links
 NLL profile

1990 births
Living people
Canadian lacrosse players
Edmonton Rush players
Lacrosse people from Ontario
New England Black Wolves players
Saskatchewan Rush players
Sportspeople from Whitby, Ontario